The 2015–16 season was Real Sociedad's 69th season in La Liga.

Season summary
On 29 June, it was announced that Mediapro had been ordered by the Supreme Court of Spain to pay Real Sociedad €10 million. The Supreme Court considered that the broadcasting company had committed serious, repeated infringements in breach of their contractual agreement with Real Sociedad.

On 9 November, it was announced that David Moyes' contract had been rescinded following a poor start to the season. The same day, the club announced the appointment of Eusebio Sacristán as his replacement.

Players

Player transfers

In

Out

Pre-season and friendlies

Competitions

Overall

Overview

La Liga

League table

Results summary

Result round by round

Matches

League

Copa del Rey

Round of 32

Statistics

Appearances and goals
Last updated on 15 May 2016.

|-
! colspan=14 style=background:#dcdcdc; text-align:center|Goalkeepers

|-
! colspan=14 style=background:#dcdcdc; text-align:center|Defenders

|-
! colspan=14 style=background:#dcdcdc; text-align:center|Midfielders

|-
! colspan=14 style=background:#dcdcdc; text-align:center|Forwards

|-
! colspan=14 style=background:#dcdcdc; text-align:center| Players who have made an appearance or had a squad number this season but have left the club

|}

References

External links
Club's official website

Real Sociedad
Real Sociedad seasons